A Nobel Committee is a working body responsible for most of the work involved in selecting Nobel Prize laureates. There are five Nobel Committees, one for each Nobel Prize.

Four of these committees (for prizes in physics, chemistry, physiology or medicine, and literature) are working bodies within their prize awarding institutions, the Royal Swedish Academy of Sciences, the Karolinska Institute, and the Swedish Academy. These four Nobel Committees only propose laureates, while the final decision is taken in a larger assembly. This assembly is composed of the entire academies for the prizes in physics, chemistry, and literature, as well as the 50 members of the Nobel Assembly at the Karolinska Institute for the prize in physiology or medicine.

The fifth Nobel Committee is the Norwegian Nobel Committee, responsible for the Nobel Peace Prize. This committee has a different status since it is both the working body and the deciding body for its prize.

See also 
Nobel Committee for Physics
Nobel Committee for Chemistry
Nobel Committee for Physiology or Medicine
Norwegian Nobel Committee
Nobel Prize controversies
Matilda effect

References 

Nobel Prize
Scientific organizations based in Sweden
Awards juries and committees